Úštěk is a town in Litoměřice District in the Ústí nad Labem Region of the Czech Republic. It has about 2,900 inhabitants. The town centre is well preserved and is protected by law as an urban monument reservation.

Administrative parts
Úštek is made up of 3 town parts and 21 villages:

Úštěk-České Předměstí
Úštěk-Českolipské Předměstí
Úštěk-Vnitřní Město
Bílý Kostelec
Brusov
Dolní Vysoké
Držovice
Dubičná
Habřina
Julčín
Kalovice
Konojedy
Lhota
Ličenice
Lukov
Ostré
Rašovice
Robeč
Rochov
Starý Týn
Tetčiněves
Třebín
Vědlice
Zelený

Geography
The town is situated on the Úštěcký Stream and on the shore of the Chmelař Pond.

History
According to archaeological excavations, the area of Úštěk was inhabited from the 10th century. The importance of Úštěk has increased in the 14th century. Around 1361, the settlement was promoted to a town. In 1475, the town was acquired by marriage by the noble family of Sezima of Ústí. Under their rule, Úštěk prospered and grew rapidly, which lasted until the Battle of White Mountain in 1620. In 1622, the Úštěk property was confiscated and fell to Prague and Litoměřice Jesuits.

Sights
The town is renowned for its medieval centre, formed by Mírové Square and its surroundings. On the square, the houses with Gothic gables have been preserved. The Church of Saints Peter and Paul on the square was built in late Baroque style in 1764–1772.

The historic centre is delimited by remains of town walls. The Pikart Tower is the largest and strongest tower of the town fortification. It is a sandstone tower built in 1428.

The restored Úštěk Synagogue also is a significant monument.

Gallery

References

External links

Cities and towns in the Czech Republic
Populated places in Litoměřice District